Pottersburg is a ghost town in Lincoln County, Kansas, United States.

History
Pottersburg was issued a post office in 1870. The post office was discontinued in 1904.

References

Former populated places in Lincoln County, Kansas
Former populated places in Kansas